A Glass of Water can refer to:
 A Glass of Water (play), an 1842 play by the French writer Eugene Scribe
 A Glass of Water (1923 film), a 1923 German film
 A Glass of Water (1960 film), a 1960 German film
 A Glass of Water (1979 film), a 1979 Russian film

See also
"Glass of Water"